The Guinea national football team (French:  Équipe de football du Guinée) represents Guinea in men's international football and it is controlled by the Guinean Football Federation. They have never qualified for the FIFA World Cup finals, and their best finish in the Africa Cup of Nations was runners-up in 1976. The team reached the quarter-finals in four recent tournaments (2004, 2006, 2008 and 2015). The team represents both FIFA and Confederation of African Football (CAF).

History
Guinea made their footballing debut in an away friendly on 9 May 1962, losing 2–1 against Togo. In 1963, Guinea entered its first qualification campaign for an Africa Cup of Nations, the 1963 tournament in Ghana. Drawn in a two-legged qualifier against Nigeria, Guinea drew the first leg 2–2 away on 27 July, and on 6 October won 1–0 at home to win 3–2 on aggregate. They were later disqualified for using Guinean officials in the second leg, and Nigeria went through to the finals in their place. In 1965, Guinea entered the qualifiers for the 1965 African Cup of Nations in Tunisia and was placed in Group A with Senegal and Mali. On 28 February, they lost 2–0 in Senegal before beating them 3–0 at home on 31 March, Senegal's win over Mali allowed them to qualify instead of Guinea.

During the 1976 African Cup of Nations the Guinean team finished second to Morocco, only missing out on the championship by a point.

In 2001, FIFA expelled the country from the qualification process of the 2002 World Cup and 2002 African Cup of Nations due to government interference in football. They returned to international action in September 2002 after a two-year ban from competition. In the 2004 African Cup of Nations, Guinea reached the quarter-finals, scoring the first goal against Mali before ultimately losing 2–1, conceding the winning goal in the last minute of the match. Guinea reached the quarter-final stage again in the 2006 tournament, taking the lead against Senegal before losing 3–2. 2008 saw Guinea reach the quarter-finals of the Africa Cup of Nations for a third successive tournament, only to suffer a 5–0 defeat against Côte d'Ivoire.

In 2012, Guinea beat Botswana 6–1 in the group stage of the 2012 Africa Cup of Nations, becoming the first side to score six goals in an Africa Cup of Nations game since Côte d'Ivoire in 1970. The team subsequently exited the tournament at the group stage after a draw against Ghana.

On 4 January 2016, CAF lifted a ban on Guinea playing their home international in Guinea after it was declared free of Ebola by the U.N. World Health Organization in December 2015.

Kit provider

Results and fixtures

The following is a list of match results in the last 12 months, as well as any future matches that have been scheduled.

2021

2022

2023

Coaching staff

Coaching history

 Petre Moldoveanu  (1975–77)
  Serge Devèze (1992–93)
  Boro Primorac (1994)
  Mykhaylo Fomenko (1994)
  Volodymyr Muntyan (1995–98)
  Henri Stambouli (1998–99)
  Bruno Metsu (2000)
  Bernard Simondi (2000–01)
  Michel Dussuyer (2002–04)
  Patrice Neveu (2004–06)
  Robert Nouzaret (2006–09)
  Titi Camara (2009)
  Mamadi Souaré (2009–10)
  Michel Dussuyer (2010–15)
  Luis Fernández (2015–16)
  Lappé Bangoura (2016–18)
  Paul Put (2018–19)
  Didier Six (2019–2021)
  Kaba Diawara (2021–)

Players

Current squad
The following players were called up for the 2023 AFCON qualification matches against Ethiopia on 24 and 27 March 2023.

Caps and goals are correct as of 27 September 2022 after the match against Ivory Coast.

Recent call-ups
The following players have been called up for Guinea in the last 12 months.

Notes
DEC = Player refused to join the team after the call-up.
INJ = Player withdrew from the squad due to an injury.
PRE = Preliminary squad.
RET = Player has retired from international football.
SUS = Suspended from the national team.
WD = Player withdrew from the squad for non-injury related reasons.

Records

Players in bold are still active with Guinea.

Competitive record

FIFA World Cup

Africa Cup of Nations

African Nations Championship

African Games

Team honours
Last updated 14 August 2017

Continental tournaments
  Africa Cup of Nations
Runners-up (1):  1976

Other Tournaments and Cups
Amilcar Cabral Cup
Champions (5): 1981, 1982, 1987, 1988, 2005
Runners-up (1): 1989

References

External links

Guineefoot
FEGUIFOOT

 
African national association football teams